No. 7 (Bomber Reconnaissance) Squadron was a Royal Canadian Air Force squadron that was active during the Second World War. 

It was amalgamated from various Rockcliffe based flights on 29 January 1936 at RCAF Station Rockcliffe near Ottawa, Ontario, as No. 7 (General Purpose) Squadron and was disbanded on 10 September 1939 to allow its personnel to bring more critical combat units up to strength with the start of the Second World War.

It was reformed at RCAF Station Prince Rupert on 8 December 1941 as an anti-submarine unit with RCAF Western Air Command. The squadron flew the Blackburn Shark, Supermarine Stranraer, Consolidated Canso and Consolidated Catalina before disbanding a final time on 25 July 1945.

References

Citations

Bibliography

 

Royal Canadian Air Force squadrons (disbanded)
Military units and formations of Canada in World War II